is a Japanese professional baseball pitcher for the Tokyo Yakult Swallows of the Nippon Professional Baseball (NPB). He has played in NPB for the Tohoku Rakuten Golden Eagles.

Career

Tohoku Rakuten Golden Eagles
Tohoku Rakuten Golden Eagles selected Kondo with the first selection in the 2017 NPB draft.

On June 6, 2018, Kondo made his NPB debut.

On December 2, 2020, he become a free agent.

Tokyo Yakult Swallows
On December 14, 2020, Kondo signed with the Tokyo Yakult Swallows of NPB.

References

External links

NPB.jp

1995 births
Living people
Baseball people from Hiroshima Prefecture
Japanese baseball players
Nippon Professional Baseball pitchers
Tohoku Rakuten Golden Eagles players
Tokyo Yakult Swallows players